John Macquarrie  (1919–2007) was a Scottish-born theologian, philosopher and Anglican priest. He was the author of Principles of Christian Theology (1966) and Jesus Christ in Modern Thought (1991). Timothy Bradshaw, writing in the Handbook of Anglican Theologians, described Macquarrie as "unquestionably Anglicanism's most distinguished systematic theologian in the second half of the 20th century."

Life and career

Macquarrie was born on 27 June 1919 in Renfrew, into a devout Presbyterian family. His father was an elder in the Church of Scotland with strong Gaelic roots. Macquarrie was educated at Paisley Grammar School before studying philosophy at the University of Glasgow under the distinguished scholar Charles Arthur Campbell (MA 1940) and obtained a degree in theology (BD 1943).

Macquarrie enlisted in the British Army and served from 1943 to 1948. He was ordained as a Presbyterian minister in the Church of Scotland in 1945 and then served in the Royal Army Chaplains Department (1945–1948). After demobilization he served as a parish minister in the Church of Scotland at St Ninian's Church, Brechin (1948–1953).

Macquarrie returned to the University of Glasgow to study for a PhD, which he was awarded in 1954 while serving as lecturer in systematic theology at Trinity College, Glasgow. His supervisor was Ian Henderson who, despite having been a pupil of Karl Barth at Basle, was theologically more closely aligned with his disputant, Rudolf Bultmann.

In 1962 Macquarrie was appointed Professor of Systematic Theology at Union Theological Seminary, New York City. During his time in the United States Macquarrie became a member of the Episcopal Church, part of the Anglican Communion. While in Scotland, he had long been attracted to the Anglican church there, but in deference to his family's feelings and their strong Presbyterian roots, he maintained his membership in the Presbyterian Church of Scotland. His involvement in the Episcopal Church in the United States eventually led him to be ordained priest by the Bishop of New York on 16 June 1965. On the next day (the Feast of Corpus Christi) he celebrated his first Eucharist at the Church of St Mary the Virgin in New York City.

He was Lady Margaret Professor of Divinity in the University of Oxford and a canon residentiary of Christ Church, Oxford, from 1970 until 1986. On retirement he continued to live in Oxford and was appointed a professor emeritus and a canon emeritus. From 1996 he had been the Martin Heidegger Professor of Philosophical Theology at the Graduate Theological Foundation in the United States.

Macquarrie was awarded the Territorial Decoration in 1962. In 1964 the University of Glasgow conferred the degree of Doctor of Letters on him and in 1969 the university awarded him the degree of Doctor of Divinity honoris causa. On his appointment to the Lady Margaret chair at Oxford he incepted as a Master of Arts. In 1981 he became a Doctor of Divinity of the University of Oxford and in 1984 he was elected a Fellow of the British Academy. He has also received the honorary degrees of Doctor of Sacred Theology from the University of the South (1967) and the General Theological Seminary (1968), Doctor of Divinity from the Episcopal Theological Seminary of the Southwest (1981), the University of Dayton (1994) and the Graduate Theological Foundation, Indiana, and Doctor of Canon Law from Nashotah House (1986).

He was the Gifford Lecturer for 1983–1984, lecturing on the topic "In Search of Deity".

Macquarrie is often categorised as both an existentialist and a systematic theologian. His most important philosophical influence is the work of Martin Heidegger. This influence can be traced to Macquarrie's 1954 dissertation, published as An Existentialist Theology: A Comparison of Heidegger and Bultmann (1955). Macquarrie remains one of the most important commentators and explainers of Heidegger's work. His co-translation of Being and Time into English is considered the canonical version. He was also a notable English-language expositor on the theological and philosophical work of Rudolf Bultmann.

Among Macquarrie's most widely read books are Existentialism, meant as an introduction to the subject, and his major work, Principles of Christian Theology, a work of systematic theology which aims to harmonise existentialism and orthodox Christian thought. His work is characterised by even-handedness to all sides and viewpoints and, although not always readily accessible to those without a good background in philosophy, his writing is considered engaging and often witty - at least judged by the standards of existentialism and systematic theology.

Views on other faith traditions
Macquarrie believed that truth value could reside in other faith traditions, although he rejected syncretism. In his book Mediators Between Human and Divine (1996), he wrote:
In 1964 I published an article entitled 'Christianity and Other Faiths'... [and] I continue to hold the views I expressed then... I believe that, however difficult it may be, we should hold to our own traditions and yet respect and even learn from the traditions of others. I drew the conclusion that there should be an end to proselytizing but that equally there should be no syncretism of the kind typified by the Baháʼí movement. (p. 2)

In that book, Macquarrie commented on what he called nine historical figures who were viewed by their followers as mediators between the human and the divine. Regarding these "mediators", Macquarrie wrote that
[T]here will be no attempt to show that any one of [the mediators] is superior to the others... what has already been said... has shown the impossibility of any such judgment. No human being - and certainly not the present writer - has the exhaustive knowledge of the several mediators or the requisite criteria for making such a judgment. Neither does he or she have the detached situation that would enable a purely objective view of the question. Only God, I suppose, could make such a judgment. (p. 12)
He concluded that
I do not deny for a moment that the truth of God has reached others through other channels – indeed, I hope and pray that it has. So while I have a special attachment to one mediator, I have respect for them all and have tried to give a fair presentation of each. (p. 12)

Macquarrie died on 28 May 2007 at the age of 87. His widow, Jenny, died in August 2008. He is survived by two sons and a daughter. His archives are maintained by the Bodleian Library, Oxford. The Macquarrie Project, a multimedia collection which includes Macquarrie's personal research library, lecture recordings, library notations and a tome of sermons, is housed at the Graduate Theological Foundation in Indiana.

Works

Books

. 2nd rev. ed. 1977.
.
.

.

.
 - a revised edition of A Dictionary of Christian Ethics
.

.

.
.
.
.
.
. Earlier editions were published in 1963 and 1981.

.
.
.

Articles

(Spring 1979). "Existentialism and theological method". Communio International Catholic Review.Vol. VI, Number 1: 5-15.

References

Further reading
 A biography of Macquarrie's life and thought is Eugene Thomas Long's Existence, Being, and God: An Introduction to the Philosophical Theology of John Macquarrie, 1985 (out of print).
 Timothy Bradshaw, "John Macquarrie", in Alister E. McGrath (ed) SPCK Handbook of Anglican Theologians (London: SPCK, 1998), p. 168.

 A detailed account of Heidegger's influence on Macquarrie, while at Glasgow, during Macquarrie's work on his 1954 dissertation, can be found in Hue Woodson's Heideggerian Theologies: The Pathmarks of John Macquarrie, Rudolf Bultmann, Paul Tillich, and Karl Rahner (Eugene: Wipf and Stock, 2018) 
A scholarly account of Macquarrie's theology in relation to New Phenomenology and Postmodernism can be found in Stephen Foster's "Theology as Repetition: John Macquarrie in Conversation" (Eugene: Wipf and Stock, 2019)

External links
Theological Studies: A bibliography of works by and about John Macquarrie
Encyclopedia of World Biography article
Thomas H. Carr, 'Only a God Can Save Us', First Things vol. 55 (August/September 1995), pp. 57-62
John Macquarrie, 'What Still Separates Us from the Catholic Church? An Anglican Reply', in Hans Küng,  Post-ecumenical Christianity (New York: Herder & Herder, 1970), pp. 45-53
Telegraph obituary
Obituary in The Independent, 1 June 2007 (written by David Fergusson, Professor of Divinity, University of Edinburgh)
In Search of Deity lectures, summary and biography

1919 births
2007 deaths
20th-century Anglican theologians
Anglican philosophers
20th-century American Episcopal priests
Anglo-Catholic clergy
Royal Army Chaplains' Department officers
Anglo-Catholic theologians
British Army personnel of World War II
Fellows of Christ Church, Oxford
Fellows of the British Academy
Union Theological Seminary (New York City) faculty
Lady Margaret Professors of Divinity
Graduate Theological Foundation faculty
20th-century Ministers of the Church of Scotland
Systematic theologians
Scottish philosophers
Scottish Episcopal theologians
Philosophers of religion
Alumni of the University of Glasgow
Academics of the University of Glasgow
People from Renfrew
Existentialist theologians
Christian existentialists
People educated at Paisley Grammar School
Heidegger scholars
Scottish Anglo-Catholics
American Episcopal theologians